April Fools' Day or All Fools' Day is an annual custom on 1 April consisting of practical jokes and hoaxes. Jokesters often expose their actions by shouting "April Fools!" at the recipient. Mass media can be involved with these pranks, which may be revealed as such the following day. The custom of setting aside a day for playing harmless pranks upon one's neighbour has been relatively common in the world historically.

Origins

Although the origins of April Fools’ is unknown, there are lots of theories surrounding it.

A disputed association between 1 April and foolishness is in Geoffrey Chaucer's The Canterbury Tales (1392). In the "Nun's Priest's Tale", a vain cock Chauntecleer is tricked by a fox on "Since March began thirty days and two," i.e. 32 days since March began, which is 1 April. However, it is not clear that Chaucer was referencing 1 April since the text of the "Nun's Priest's Tale" also states that the story takes place on the day when the sun is "in the sign of Taurus had y-rune Twenty degrees and one," which would not be 1 April. Modern scholars believe that there is a copying error in the extant manuscripts and that Chaucer actually wrote, "Syn March was gon". If so, the passage would have originally meant 32 days after March, i.e. 2 May, the anniversary of the engagement of King Richard II of England to Anne of Bohemia, which took place in 1381.

In 1508, French poet Eloy d'Amerval referred to a poisson d'avril (April fool, literally "April's fish"), possibly the first reference to the celebration in France. Some historians suggest that April Fools' originated because, in the Middle Ages, New Year's Day was celebrated on 25 March in most European towns, with a holiday that in some areas of France, specifically, ended on 1 April, and those who celebrated New Year's Eve on 1 January made fun of those who celebrated on other dates by the invention of April Fools' Day. The use of 1 January as New Year's Day became common in France only in the mid-16th century, and that date was not adopted officially until 1564, by the Edict of Roussillon, as called for during the Council of Trent in 1563. However, there are issues with this theory because there is an unambiguous reference to April Fools' Day in a 1561 poem by Flemish poet Eduard de Dene of a nobleman who sends his servants on foolish errands on 1 April, predating the change. April Fools' Day was also an established tradition in Great Britain before 1 January was established as the start of the calendar year.

In the Netherlands, the origin of April Fools' Day is often attributed to the Dutch victory in 1572 in the Capture of Brielle, where the Spanish Duke Álvarez de Toledo was defeated. "Op 1 april verloor Alva zijn bril" is a Dutch proverb, which can be translated as: "On the first of April, Alva lost his glasses". In this case, "bril" ("glasses" in Dutch) serves as a homonym for Brielle (the town where it happened). This theory, however, provides no explanation for the international celebration of April Fools' Day.

In 1686, John Aubrey referred to the celebration as "Fooles holy day", the first British reference. On 1 April 1698, several people were tricked into going to the Tower of London to "see the Lions washed".

Although no biblical scholar or historian is known to have mentioned a relationship, some have expressed the belief that the origins of April Fools' Day may go back to the Genesis flood narrative. In a 1908 edition of the Harper's Weekly cartoonist Bertha R. McDonald wrote:

Long-standing customs

United Kingdom

In the UK, an April Fool prank is sometimes later revealed by shouting "April fool!" at the recipient, who becomes the "April fool". A study in the 1950s, by folklorists Iona and Peter Opie, found that in the UK, and in countries whose traditions derived from the UK, this continues to be the practice, with the custom ceasing at noon, after which time it is no longer acceptable to play pranks. Thus a person playing a prank after midday is considered the "April fool" themselves.

In Scotland, April Fools' Day was originally called "Huntigowk Day". The name is a corruption of "hunt the gowk", gowk being Scots for a cuckoo or a foolish person; alternative terms in Gaelic would be Là na Gocaireachd, "gowking day", or Là Ruith na Cuthaige, "the day of running the cuckoo". The traditional prank is to ask someone to deliver a sealed message that supposedly requests help of some sort. In fact, the message reads "Dinna laugh, dinna smile. Hunt the gowk another mile." The recipient, upon reading it, will explain they can only help if they first contact another person, and they send the victim to this next person with an identical message, with the same result.

In England a "fool" is known by a few different names around the country, including "noodle", "gob", "gobby", or "noddy".

Ireland
In Ireland, it was traditional to entrust the victim with an "important letter" to be given to a named person. That person would read the letter, then ask the victim to take it to someone else, and so on. The letter when opened contained the words "send the fool further".

Italy, France, Belgium, French-speaking areas
In Italy, France, Belgium and French-speaking areas of Switzerland and Canada, the 1 April tradition is often known as "April fish" (poisson d'avril in French, april vis in Dutch or pesce d'aprile in Italian). Possible pranks include attempting to attach a paper fish to the victim's back without being noticed. This fish feature is prominently present on many late 19th- to early 20th-century French April Fools' Day postcards. Many newspapers also spread a false story on April Fish Day, and a subtle reference to a fish is sometimes given as a clue to the fact that it is an April Fools' prank.

Germany
In Germany, an April Fool prank is sometimes later revealed by shouting "April, April!" at the recipient, who becomes the "April fool".

Nordic countries
Danes, Finns, Icelanders, Norwegians and Swedes celebrate April Fools' Day (aprilsnar in Danish; aprillipäivä in Finnish; aprilsnarr in Norwegian; aprilskämt in Swedish). Most news media outlets will publish exactly one false story on 1 April; for newspapers this will typically be a first-page article but not the top headline.

Poland (Prima aprilis)
In Poland, prima April ("First April" in Latin) as a day of pranks is a centuries-long tradition. It is a day when many pranks are played: sometimes very sophisticated hoaxes are prepared by people, media (which often cooperate to make the "information" more credible), and even public institutions. Serious activities are usually avoided; every word said on 1 April could be untrue. The conviction for this is so strong that the Polish anti-Turkish alliance with Leopold I, signed on 1 April 1683, was backdated to 31 March. However, for some in Poland prima April ends at noon of 1 April and prima April jokes after that hour are considered inappropriate and not classy.

Ukraine
April Fools' Day is widely celebrated in Odessa and has the special local name Humorina - in Ukrainian Гуморина (Humorina). This holiday arose in 1973. An April Fool prank is revealed by saying "Первое Апреля, никому не верю" ("Pervoye Aprelya, nikomu ne veryu") - which means "First of April, I trust nobody" -  to the recipient. The festival includes a large parade in the city centre, free concerts, street fairs and performances. Festival participants dress up in a variety of costumes and walk around the city fooling around and pranking passersby. One of the traditions on April Fools' Day is to dress up the main city monument in funny clothes. Humorina even has its own logo  a cheerful sailor in a lifebelt — whose author was the artist Arkady Tsykun. During the festival, special souvenirs bearing the logo are printed and sold everywhere. Since 2010, April Fools' Day celebrations include an International Clown Festival and both celebrated as one. In 2019, the festival was dedicated to the 100th anniversary of the Odessa Film Studio and all events were held with an emphasis on cinema.

Spanish-speaking countries
In many Spanish-speaking countries (and the Philippines), "Día de los Santos Inocentes" (Holy Innocents Day) is a festivity which is very similar to April Fools' Day, but it is celebrated in late December (27, 28 or 29 depending on the location).

Turkey
Turkey also has a custom of April Fools' pranks. Pranks and jokes are usually verbal and are revealed by shouting "Bir Nisan!" (April 1st!).

Iran
In Iran, it is called "Dorugh-e Sizdah" (lie of Thirteen) and people and media prank on 13 Farvardin (Sizdah bedar) that is equivalent of 1 April. It is a tradition that takes place 13 days after the Persian new year Nowruz. On this day, people go out and leave their houses and have fun outside mostly in natural parks.
Pranks have reportedly been played on this holiday since 536 BC in the Achaemenid Empire.

Israel
Israel has adopted the custom of pranking on April Fools' Day.

Lebanon
In Lebanon, an April Fool prank is revealed by saying  (which translates to "First of April Lie") to the recipient.

Pranks

A common prank is to carefully remove the cream from an Oreo and replace it with toothpaste, and there are many similar pranks that replace an object (usually food) with another object that looks like the object but tastes different such as replacing sugar with salt and vanilla frosting with sour cream. As well as people playing pranks on one another on April Fools' Day, elaborate pranks have appeared on radio and television stations, newspapers, and websites, and have been performed by large corporations. In one famous prank in 1957, the BBC broadcast a film in their Panorama current affairs series purporting to show Swiss farmers picking freshly-grown spaghetti, in what they called the Swiss spaghetti harvest. The BBC was soon flooded with requests to purchase a spaghetti plant, forcing them to declare the film a hoax on the news the next day.

With the advent of the Internet and readily available global news services, April Fools' pranks can catch and embarrass a wider audience than ever before.

Comparable prank days

28 December
28 December, the equivalent day in Spain and Hispanic America, is also the Christian day of celebration of the Day of the Holy Innocents. The Christian celebration is a religious holiday in its own right, but the tradition of pranks is not, though the latter is observed yearly. In some regions of Hispanic America after a prank is played, the cry is made, "Inocente palomita que te dejaste engañar" ("You innocent little dove that let yourself be fooled!"; not to be confused with another meaning of palomita, which means "popcorn" in some dialects).

In Argentina, the prankster says, "¡Que la inocencia te valga!" which roughly translates as advice to not be as gullible as the victim of the prank. In Spain, it is common to say just "¡Inocente!" (which in Spanish can mean "innocent" or "gullible").

In Colombia, the term  is used as "Pásala por Inocentes", which roughly means: "Let it go; today it's Innocent's Day."

In Belgium, this day is also known as the "Day of the Innocent Children" or "Day of the Stupid Children". It used to be a day where parents, grandparents, and teachers would fool the children in some way. But the celebration of this day has died out in favour of April Fools' Day.

Nevertheless, on the Spanish island of Menorca, Dia d'enganyar ("Fooling day") is celebrated on 1 April because Menorca was a British possession during part of the 18th century. In Brazil, the "Dia da mentira" ("Day of the lie") is also celebrated on 1 April due to the Portuguese influence.

First day of a new month
In many English-speaking countries, mainly Britain, Ireland, Australia, New Zealand and South Africa, it is a custom to say "pinch and a punch for the first of the month" or an alternative, typically by children. The victim might respond with "a flick and a kick for being so quick", and the attacker might reply with "a punch in the eye for being so sly".

Another custom in Britain and North America is to say "rabbit rabbit" upon waking on the first day of a month, for good luck.

Reception
The practice of April Fool pranks and hoaxes is controversial. The mixed opinions of critics are epitomized in the reception to the 1957 BBC "spaghetti-tree hoax", in reference to which, newspapers were split over whether it was "a great joke or a terrible hoax on the public".

The positive view is that April Fools' can be good for one's health because it encourages "jokes, hoaxes ... pranks, [and] belly laughs", and brings all the benefits of laughter including stress relief and reducing strain on the heart. There are many "best of" April Fools' Day lists that are compiled in order to showcase the best examples of how the day is celebrated. Various April Fools' campaigns have been praised for their innovation, creativity, writing, and general effort.

The negative view describes April Fools' hoaxes as "creepy and manipulative", "rude" and "a little bit nasty", as well as based on Schadenfreude and deceit. When genuine news or a genuine important order or warning is issued on April Fools' Day, there is risk that it will be misinterpreted as a joke and ignored – for example, when Google, known to play elaborate April Fools' Day hoaxes, announced the launch of Gmail with 1-gigabyte inboxes in 2004, an era when competing webmail services offered 4-megabytes or less, many dismissed it as a joke outright. On the other hand, sometimes stories intended as jokes are taken seriously. Either way, there can be adverse effects, such as confusion, misinformation, waste of resources (especially when the hoax concerns people in danger) and even legal or commercial consequences.

In March 2020, during the COVID-19 pandemic, various organizations and people cancelled their April Fools' Day celebrations, or advocated against observing April Fools' Day, as a mark of respect due to the large amount of tragic deaths that COVID-19 had caused up to that point, the wish to provide truthful information to counter the misinformation about the virus, and to pre-empt any attempts to incorporate the virus into any potential pranks. For example, Google decided not to continue "its infamous April Fools’ jokes" tradition for that year. Because the pandemic was still ongoing a year later in 2021, they also decided not to do pranks that year.

In Thailand, the police warned ahead of April Fools' in 2021 that posting or sharing fake news online could lead to maximum of five years imprisonment.

Other examples of genuine news on 1 April mistaken as a hoax include:
1 April 1946: Warnings about the Aleutian Island earthquake's tsunami that killed 165 people in Hawaii and Alaska.
1 April 1984: News that the singer Marvin Gaye was shot and killed the day before his 45th birthday by his father Marvin Gay Sr. (sic) on 1 April 1984. Several people close to Gaye such as fellow singers Smokey Robinson and Jermaine Jackson, brother of Michael Jackson didn't believe the news initially and had to phone call other people who knew Gaye to confirm the news, Al Sharpton during his interview for the VH1 documentary VH1's Most Shocking Moments in Rock & Roll referenced the coincidence of the date when he said that Gaye's death came "like a sick, sad joke to all of us."
1 April 1995: News that the singer Selena was shot and killed by the former president of her fan club Yolanda Saldívar on 31 March 1995. When radio station KEDA broke the news on 31 March 1995, many people accused the staff of lying because the next day was April Fools' Day.
1 April 2004: Gmail is announced to the public by Google. Some of the  announced features for the service were not considered technologically possible with the technology available in 2004.
1 April 2005: News that the comedian Mitch Hedberg had died on 29 March 2005.
1 April 2005: Announcement about Powerpuff Girls Z, by Aniplex, Cartoon Network and Toei Animation. The TV show was an anime adaption of the cartoon The Powerpuff Girls and the idea that a cartoon would get turned into an anime was considered very outlandish in 2005 as this was the first time it happened.
1 April 2008: Announcement that the NationStates government simulation browser game had received a cease and desist letter from the United Nations (UN) for unauthorized usage of its name and emblem for the fictional intergovernmental organization where players (as nations) can create and vote on international law within the game world and that due to this, NationStates has now changed its version of the UN into the "World Assembly" (WA) with a different emblem. On 2 April 2008, NationStates developer Max Barry revealed that the letter from the UN was in fact real and he had actually received it on 21 January 2008 but chose only to start complying with it on 1 April to deliberately fool people into thinking the announcement was the annual NationStates April Fools prank and that because the legal action was real, the changes are permanent.
1 April 2009: Announcement that the long running soap opera Guiding Light was being cancelled. The date was so heavily associated with jokes and pranks that even some of the cast and crew didn't believe the news when it was announced by CBS, the TV network that aired the show.
1 April 2011: Isaiah Thomas declared for the NBA draft. Thomas is short and basketball players in the NBA are usually taller than average as height gives advantage to playing basketball.

In popular culture
Books, films, telemovies and television episodes have used April Fools' Day as their title or inspiration. Examples include Bryce Courtenay's novel April Fool's Day (1993), whose title refers to the day Courtenay's son died. The 1990s sitcom Roseanne featured an episode titled "April Fools' Day". This turned out to be intentionally misleading, as the episode was about Tax Day in the United States on 15 April – the last day to submit the previous year's tax information. Although Tax Day is usually 15 April as depicted in the episode, it can be moved back a few days if that day is on a weekend or a holiday in Washington, D.C. or some states, or due to natural disasters when it can occur as late as 15 July.

Further reading

 Similar events documented by other Wiki languages also exist such as Poisson d'avril (France) and in the USA the International day of the joke event which is assigned the first Sunday in May.

See also

Feast of Fools, a similar medieval festival
List of April Fools' Day jokes
List of practical joke topics

References

Bibliography

External links

 
April observances
Unofficial observances
Practical jokes